Edwin Marsden (26 April 1913 – 30 August 1975) was a British trade unionist and communist activist.

Born in the Openshaw area of Manchester, Marsden trained as a draughtsman but instead became a steel erector.

In 1935, Marsden joined the Communist Party of Great Britain (CPGB), radicalised in opposition to the Italian invasion of Abyssinia.  He also joined the Constructional Engineering Union, serving as a site steward for more than thirty years.

In 1952, Marsden was elected to the executive of the union, representing North West England, and in 1962 he became the union's full-time organiser for the region, also representing the union on the executive of the Confederation of Shipbuilding and Engineering Unions.  Meanwhile, he became increasingly prominent in the CPGB, serving on its Lancashire and Cheshire District Committee, and standing unsuccessfully for the party in the 1963 Manchester Openshaw by-election, and again in the seat in the 1964 and 1966 general elections.  In 1968, he was elected to the party's Executive Committee.

Marsden was elected as general secretary of the union in 1968.  Three years later it became part of the Amalgamated Union of Engineering Workers, albeit remaining largely autonomous, with Marsden continuing as general secretary of the union's new Construction section.  This gave Marsden increased prominence in the trade union movement, and he was a prominent figure at meetings of the Trades Union Congress.

Marsden died in 1975, still in office.

References

1913 births
1975 deaths
Communist Party of Great Britain members
General Secretaries of the Amalgamated Engineering Union
People from Openshaw
Trade unionists from Manchester